Wally Walrus is an animated cartoon character who appeared in several films produced by Walter Lantz Productions in the 1940s, 1950s and 1960s. He has also since appeared in various cartoon programs of more recent decades.

History
Wally is an anthropomorphic walrus. In most of his appearances, he speaks with a pronounced Swedish accent, and is rather slow-witted and prone to anger when provoked. He often hums My Bonnie Lies Over the Ocean to himself. He is depicted most frequently as one of Woody Woodpecker's main foils, sharing the same dynamic with him as with Buzz Buzzard.

Wally was voiced in his original appearance and subsequent others by Jack Mather, who voiced The Cisco Kid on radio. Lantz stock player William Wright gave him a growly, non-Swedish voice in The Reckless Driver. Wally also appeared with Andy Panda in Dog Tax Dodgers, and with Chilly Willy in Clash and Carry and Tricky Trout; in the latter two shorts he was voiced by Paul Frees.

The character's appearance changed somewhat over the years, with a complexion that ranged from dark to light flesh-tone and variously sized tusks, which Wally would be drawn with or without. A frequent animation goof on The New Woody Woodpecker Show was to draw Wally's mouth separate from his tusks so it appeared they were protruding from his nostrils.

A character resembling Wally appeared in a cameo during the final scene of Who Framed Roger Rabbit, and was featured in various print media and merchandise.

Wally was a regular character on The New Woody Woodpecker Show, voiced by Billy West.

A character parodying Wally Walrus has made a cameo in the fifth season of Samurai Jack on Adult Swim, and is once again voiced by Billy West using a similar voice to his other character Zoidberg on Futurama.

Wally Walrus appears in the 2018 Woody Woodpecker series and also has a girlfriend named Wendy Walrus.

Appearances

The Beach Nut (1944)
Ski for Two  (1944)
Chew-Chew Baby (1945)
The Dippy Diplomat (1945)
Bathing Buddies (1946)
The Reckless Driver (1946)
Smoked Hams (1947)
The Overture to William Tell (1947)
Well Oiled (1947)
The Mad Hatter (1948)
Banquet Busters (1948)
Kiddie Koncert (1948)
Wacky-Bye Baby (1948)
Dog Tax Dodgers (1948)
Sleep Happy (1951)
Slingshot 6 7/8 (1951)
The Woody Woodpecker Polka (1951)
Stage Hoax (1952)
What's Sweepin' (1953)
Buccaneer Woodpecker (1953)
Operation Sawdust (1953)
Clash and Carry (1961)
Tricky Trout (1961)

References

Film characters introduced in 1944
Universal Pictures cartoons and characters
Fictional pinnipeds
Woody Woodpecker
Fictional Swedish people
Male characters in animation
Anthropomorphic mammals
Walter Lantz Productions cartoons and characters